Kathryn Crosby (born Olive Kathryn Grandstaff; November 25, 1933) is a retired American actress and singer who performed in films under the stage names Kathryn Grant and Kathryn Grandstaff.

Early life and education
Born Olive Kathryn Grandstaff in West Columbia, Texas, she graduated from the University of Texas at Austin with a Bachelor of Fine Arts degree in 1955. Two years later she became Bing Crosby's second wife, being more than thirty years his junior. The couple had three children, Harry, Mary Frances, and Nathaniel.

Career
She appeared as a guest star on her husband's 1964–1965 ABC sitcom The Bing Crosby Show. 

Crosby largely retired from acting after her marriage, but did have featured roles as Princess Parisa in The 7th Voyage of Sinbad (1958), and in the courtroom drama Anatomy of a Murder (1959). She also played the part of "Mama Bear" alongside her husband and children in Goldilocks and co-starred with Jack Lemmon in the comedy Operation Mad Ball (1957), with Tony Curtis in the drama Mister Cory (1957) and as a trapeze artist in The Big Circus (1959). In the mid-1970s, she hosted The Kathryn Crosby Show, a 30-minute local talk-show on KPIX-TV in San Francisco. Husband Bing appeared as a guest occasionally. Since Bing Crosby's death in 1977, she has taken on a few smaller roles and the lead in the short-lived 1996 Broadway musical State Fair.

On June 16, 1963, Crosby received her nurse's cap, signifying her becoming a registered nurse after studying at Queen of Angels Hospital in Los Angeles.

For 16 years ending in 2001, Crosby hosted the Crosby National Golf Tournament at Bermuda Run Country Club in Bermuda Run, North Carolina. A nearby bridge carrying U.S. Route 158 over the Yadkin River is named for Kathryn Crosby.
 
On November 4, 2010, Crosby was seriously injured in an automobile accident in the Sierra Nevada that killed her 85-year-old second husband, Maurice William Sullivan, whom she had married in 2000.

Filmography 

So This Is Love (1953) – Showgirl (uncredited)
Arrowhead (1953) – Miss Mason (uncredited)
Forever Female (1953) – Young Hopeful (uncredited)
Casanova's Big Night (1954) – Girl on Bridge (uncredited)
Living It Up (1954) – Manicurist (uncredited)
Rear Window (1954) – Girl at Songwriter's Party (uncredited)
Unchained (1955) – Sally Haskins (uncredited)
Tight Spot (1955) – Girl Honeymooner (uncredited)
Cell 2455 Death Row (1955) – Jo-Anne
5 Against the House (1955) – Jean, Young Woman in Nightclub (uncredited)
The Phenix City Story (1955) – Ellie Rhodes
My Sister Eileen (1955) – Young Hopeful (uncredited)
Storm Center (1956) – Hazel Levering
Reprisal! (1956) – Taini
The Wild Party (1956) – Honey
Mister Cory (1957) – Jen Vollard
The Guns of Fort Petticoat (1957) – Anne Martin
The Night the World Exploded (1957) – Laura Hutchinson
Operation Mad Ball (1957) – Lt. Betty Bixby
The Brothers Rico (1957) – Norah Malaks Rico
Gunman's Walk (1958) – Clee Chouard
The 7th Voyage of Sinbad (1958) – Princess Parisa
Anatomy of a Murder (1959) – Mary Pilant
The Big Circus (1959) – Jeannie Whirling
1001 Arabian Nights (1959) – Princess Yasminda (voice)
Queen of the Lot (2010) – Elizabeth Lambert

References

External links 

1933 births
Living people
20th-century American actresses
Actresses from Houston
American film actresses
American musical theatre actresses
American television actresses
American television personalities
American voice actresses
American women singers
American women television personalities
Bing Crosby
People from West Columbia, Texas
University of Texas at Austin alumni